The Atlantic Coast Conference Baseball Coach of the Year is a baseball award given to the Atlantic Coast Conference's most outstanding coach. The award was first given after the 1981 season.

Eight coaches have won the award more than once, with Mike Martin of Florida State having the most with seven. Of these coaches, four have won in consecutive years, with Brian O'Connor having done so on two occasions with Virginia, but only Dan McDonnell of Louisville has won three consecutive awards. McDonnell won these awards in Louisville's first three seasons as an ACC member.

Of the 15 schools that have played baseball in the ACC since the award was first presented, 10 have had a coach win the award. Among current members, all four exceptions joined the ACC in the 21st century. Virginia Tech joined in 2004 and Boston College joined in 2005, triggering a significant conference realignment in NCAA Division I. A later realignment in 2013 saw Notre Dame and Pittsburgh join the ACC. Maryland, a charter member of the ACC that left for the Big Ten Conference in 2014, never won the award. (Current ACC member Syracuse dropped the sport in 1972, decades before it joined the ACC alongside Notre Dame and Pittsburgh; the other former ACC member, South Carolina, left the ACC in 1971, a decade before the award was established.)

Key

Winners

Winners by school
Because NCAA baseball is a spring sport, the "year joined" is the calendar year before the first season of competition.

Footnotes
 The University of Maryland left the ACC in 2014 to join the Big Ten.

References

Coach Of The Year
NCAA Division I baseball conference coaches of the year